"Lonely Women Make Good Lovers" is a song written by Freddy Weller and Spooner Oldham, and first recorded by American country music artist Bob Luman. Luman's version was the second single from his 1972 album of the same name. He released the single on August 2, 1972, and it debuted on the Hot Country Singles (now Hot Country Songs) charts in September, spending nineteen weeks on it and peaking at number 4.  Weller released his version of the song on his October 1972 album, The Roadmaster.

In December 1983, Steve Wariner covered the song for his album Midnight Fire on RCA Nashville. Wariner's rendition of the song first charted on the same chart in December 1983, also reaching a peak of number 4 in early 1984.

Chart performance

Bob Luman

Steve Wariner

References

1972 songs
1972 singles
1983 singles
Bob Luman songs
Steve Wariner songs
Songs written by Freddy Weller
Songs written by Spooner Oldham
Song recordings produced by Tony Brown (record producer)
Song recordings produced by Norro Wilson
Epic Records singles
RCA Records singles
Songs about loneliness